Agatha Kongkal Sangma (born 24 July 1980) is an Indian politician serving as a Member of Parliament, Lok Sabha representing the Tura constituency of Meghalaya. At the age of 29, she is the youngest member of parliament ever in India to be appointed Union Minister in Government of India till date. Sangma is the second woman from Northeast India to be appointed a union minister in the Government of India after Renuka Devi Barkataki from Assam. She is a member of National People's Party.

Early and personal life
Agatha Sangma was born in New Delhi to P. A. Sangma, the former speaker of the Lok Sabha, and Soradini K. Sangma. She was brought up in West Garo Hills, Meghalaya. Her brother Conrad Sangma is the Chief Minister in the  Meghalaya State Assembly. Agatha married Dr. Patrick Rongma Marak on 21 November 2019.

Education
She received her LLB degree from Pune University and later joined the bar in Delhi High Court. She did her master's degree in environmental management at the University of Nottingham, UK.

Career
Sangma was first elected to the 14th Lok Sabha in a by-election in May 2008, after her father P.A. Sangma resigned from the seat to enter state politics. Later she was re elected to 15th Lok Sabha. At age 29, Sangma is the youngest Member of Parliament ever to be appointed Union Minister in Government of India till date. 

Sangma was Minister of State for Rural development. She resigned from this post during the cabinet reshuffle in October 2012.

It was reported in November 2017 that she would contest the 2018 Meghalaya legislative assembly election on a National People's Party (NPP) ticket. She contested from the South Tura constituency and polled 6,499 votes winning the seat. But she submitted her resignation as member of the House in an attempt to pave way for her brother to contest the bypoll from her constituency.

See also
 Second Manmohan Singh ministry

References

External links
 Agatha K. Sangma Profile at india.gov.in

1980 births
Living people
India MPs 2004–2009
India MPs 2009–2014
People from Tura, Meghalaya
Union ministers of state of India
Nationalist Congress Party politicians from Meghalaya
Savitribai Phule Pune University alumni
Alumni of the University of Nottingham
Women in Meghalaya politics
Lok Sabha members from Meghalaya
Indian environmentalists
National People's Party (India) politicians
21st-century Indian lawyers
21st-century Indian women politicians
21st-century Indian politicians
Women union ministers of state of India
Indian women environmentalists
Activists from Meghalaya
Meghalaya MLAs 2018–2023
India MPs 2019–present
Women members of the Lok Sabha
21st-century Indian women lawyers
Garo people